Pen-y-cae is a village and community in Wrexham County Borough, Wales. The population of the community taken at the 2011 census was 3,389. It adjoins the larger village of Rhosllanerchrugog.

Etymology 
Pen-y-cae means 'head of the field' or 'end of the field'. 

It is not an uncommon name, with three other settlements in Wales having the same name:  
Pen-y-cae, Powys
Pen-y-cae, Bridgend 
Pen-y-cae, Neath Port Talbot

Although often written as one word without hyphens, in its correct form the name is hyphenised due to the definite article 'y' preceding a single-syllable element.

History 

The village was part of the ancient parish of Ruabon and the district was known as Dynhinlle Uchaf (but also known as Y Dref Fechan or Cristionydd Fechan).

The new parish of Pen-y-cae was formed 1879, from parts of the existing parishes of Ruabon, Rhosllanerchrugog and Rhosymedre. St Thomas' Church Penycae, then-Parish Church, was consecrated in 1878. However, most of the population of the parish were nonconformists and attended the Baptist chapels of Salem and Sion in Groes; the Calvinistic Methodist chapels in Groes and Tainant; the Wesleyan chapel of Soar in Stryt Issa; or the Primitive Methodist chapel in Copperas.

Industry/employment 

Coal was extracted from pits at Plas Bennion, Wynn Hall, Afon Eitha, Cristionydd, Groes and Plas Isaf; zinc was worked at Copperas. The area descending towards Acrefair was known as "The Delph", it was served by extensions of the Ruabon Brook Tramway but these were mostly defunct by the mid-20th century.

Most inhabitants find employment outside the village in Wrexham with only a few local shops or public buildings providing jobs.

Dee Valley Water operates two reservoirs in Pen-y-cae: Pen-y-cae Upper and Pen-y-cae Lower.

Transport

Wright & Son, ran a bus service from Pen-y-cae to Wrexham via Rhos, and later via Ponciau also. When the bus industry was de-regulated in 1986 there was fierce competition between Wright's and the much larger Crosville company. Wright's, the last surviving independent local company, ceased operations in 1993 leaving Crosville as the sole service provider in the Wrexham area.

Notable residents
 The Wales and Bolton Wanderers footballer, Robert Roberts, was born in Pen-y-cae in July 1864.

References

Bibliography
 Dennis W Gilpin, "Rhosllannerchrugog, Johnstown, Ponciau, Pen-y-cae, a collection of pictures - Volume I" (1991)
 Dennis W Gilpin, "Rhosllannerchrugog, Johnstown, Ponciau, Pen-y-cae, a collection of pictures - Volume II" (1992)
 Colin Gibbs, "Clatter of Clogs" (1990)

External links

 Pen-y-cae Community Council
 Pen-y-cae Football Club
 The Church of the Nazarene, Pen-y-cae
 St Thomas' Church, Pen-y-cae
 Photos of Pen-y-cae and surrounding area on Geograph

Villages in Wrexham County Borough
Communities in Wrexham County Borough